The First Canadian Ministry was the first cabinet chaired by Prime Minister John A. Macdonald.  It governed Canada from 1 July 1867 to 5 November 1873, including all of the 1st Canadian Parliament as well as the first eight months of the Second.  The government was formed by the Liberal-Conservative Party in coalition with the old Conservative Party of Canada.  Macdonald was also Prime Minister in the Third Canadian Ministry.

Ministers 
Prime Minister
1 July 1867 – 7 November 1873: John A. Macdonald 
Minister of Agriculture
1 July 1867 – 16 November 1869: Jean-Charles Chapais
16 November 1869 – 25 October 1871: Christopher Dunkin
25 October 1871 – 7 November 1873: John Henry Pope
Minister of Customs
1 July 1867 – 22 February 1873: Samuel Leonard Tilley
22 February 1873 – 7 November 1873: Charles Tupper
Minister of Finance
1 July 1867 – 18 November 1867: Alexander Tilloch Galt
18 November 1867 – 9 October 1869: John Rose
9 October 1869 – 22 February 1873: Francis Hincks
22 February 1873 – 7 November 1873: Samuel Leonard Tilley
Superintendent-General of Indian Affairs
22 May 1868 – 8 December 1869: The Secretary of State of Canada (Ex officio)
22 May 1868 – 8 December 1869: Hector-Louis Langevin
8 December 1869 – 1 July 1873: The Secretary of State of the Provinces (Ex officio)
8 December 1869 – 7 May 1873: Joseph Howe
7 May 1873 – 14 June 1873: James Cox Aikins (Acting)
14 June 1873 – 1 July 1873: Thomas Nicholson Gibbs
1 July 1873 – 7 November 1873: The Minister of the Interior (Ex officio)
1 July 1873 – 7 November 1873: Alexander Campbell
Minister of Inland Revenue
1 July 1867 – 15 July 1868: William Pearce Howland
15 July 1868 – 15 November 1869: Alexander Campbell (Acting)
16 November 1869 – 2 July 1872Ai: Alexander Morris
2 July 1872 – 4 March 1873: Charles Tupper
4 March 1873 – 1 July 1873: John O'Connor
1 July 1873 – 7 November 1873: Thomas Nicholson Gibbs
Minister of the Interior
Was the Secretary of State for the Provinces to 30 June 1873.
1 July 1873 – 7 November 1873: Alexander Campbell
Minister of Justice
1 July 1867 – 7 November 1873: John A. Macdonald 
Attorney General of Canada
1 July 1867 – 7 November 1873: The Minister of Justice (Ex officio)
1 July 1867 – 7 November 1873: John A. Macdonald 
Leader of the Government in the Senate
1 July 1867 – 5 November 1873: Alexander Campbell
Minister of Marine and Fisheries
1 July 1867 – 7 November 1873: Peter Mitchell
Minister of Militia and Defence
1 July 1867 – 21 May 1873: George-Étienne Cartier
21 May 1873 – 30 June 1873: Hector-Louis Langevin (Acting)
1 July 1873 – 7 November 1873: Hugh McDonald
Postmaster General
1 July 1867 – 1 July 1873: Alexander Campbell
1 July 1873 – 7 November 1873: John O'Connor
President of the Privy Council
1 July 1867 – 30 December 1867: Adam Johnston Fergusson Blair
30 December 1867 – 30 January 1869: John A. Macdonald (Acting)
30 January 1869 – 16 November 1869: Joseph Howe
16 November 1869 – 21 June 1870: Edward Kenny
21 June 1870 – 2 July 1872: Charles Tupper
2 July 1872 – 4 March 1873: John O'Connor
4 March 1873 – 14 June 1873: John A. Macdonald (Acting)
14 June 1873 – 1 July 1873: Hugh McDonald
1 July 1873 – 7 November 1873: John A. Macdonald (Acting)
Minister of Public Works
1 July 1867 – 29 September 1869: William McDougall
29 September 1869 – 8 December 1869: Hector-Louis Langevin (Acting)
8 December 1869 – 7 November 1873: Hector-Louis Langevin
Receiver General
1 July 1867 – 4 July 1867: Vacant
4 July 1867 – 16 November 1869: Edward Kenny
16 November 1869 – 30 January 1873: Jean-Charles Chapais
30 January 1873 – 7 November 1873: Théodore Robitaille
Secretary of State of Canada
1 July 1867 – 8 December 1869: Hector-Louis Langevin
8 December 1869 – 7 November 1873: James Cox Aikins
Registrar General of Canada
1 July 1867 – 7 November 1873: The Secretary of State of Canada (Ex officio)
1 July 1867 – 8 December 1869: Hector-Louis Langevin
8 December 1869 – 7 November 1873: James Cox Aikins
Secretary of State for the Provinces
1 July 1867 – 1 May 1868: Adams George Archibald
1 May 1868 – 16 November 1869: Vacant (Edmund Allen Meredith was acting)
16 November 1869 – 7 May 1873: Joseph Howe
7 May 1873 – 14 June 1873: James Cox Aikins (Acting)
14 June 1873 – 1 July 1873: Thomas Nicholson Gibbs
Became Minister of the Interior from 1 July 1873.

References

Succession

01
1867 establishments in Canada
1872 disestablishments in Canada
Cabinets established in 1867
Cabinets disestablished in 1872
Ministries of Queen Victoria